Exploring the Earth and the Cosmos is a book written by Isaac Asimov in 1982.

Books by Isaac Asimov
1982 non-fiction books
Astronomy books